A chewing gum bug is a practical joke gag used to play tricks on people, usually adults. The appearance is of a 5-pack of chewing gum, with one stick of gum remaining. The trick works when the prankster tricks the victim into pulling out the last stick of gum. A small rubber bug (folded back to fit in the pack) springs out and smacks the victim on the finger they used to hold the fake stick of chewing gum. It does not injure the victim, though it can potentially annoy the victim.

The "shocking gum" variant delivers a mild electric shock to the victim. Other versions set off a cap.

See also
 List of practical joke topics

Chewing gum
Practical joke devices